The Cross-Linguistic Linked Data (CLLD) project coordinates over a dozen linguistics databases covering the languages of the world. It is hosted by the Department of Linguistic and Cultural Evolution at the Max Planck Institute for Evolutionary Anthropology in Leipzig, Germany (previously at the Max Planck Institute for the Science of Human History in Jena).

Databases and projects
Glottolog
World Atlas of Language Structures (WALS)
World Loanword Database (WOLD)
Atlas of Pidgin and Creole Language Structures (APICS)
Automated Similarity Judgment Program (ASJP)
Intercontinental Dictionary Series (IDS)
Electronic World Atlas of Varieties of English (eWAVE)
A world-wide survey of affix borrowing (AfBo)
South American Indigenous Language Structures Online (SAILS)
PHOIBLE
Tsammalex
Comparative Siouan Dictionary (CSD)
Concepticon
Dogon languages
Database of Cross-Linguistic Colexifications
Glottobank (includes Lexibank, Grambank, Phonobank, Parabank, Numeralbank)
Dictionaria
Australian Message Stick Database (AMSD)
Language Description Heritage (LDH)
Cross-Linguistic Data Formats (CLDF)
Cross-Linguistic Transcription Systems (CLTS)
Language Description Heritage (LDH) open-access library

References

External links
Cross-Linguistic Linked Data
CLLD on Zenodo
Lexibank on Zenodo

 
Linguistics databases
Max Planck Institute for Evolutionary Anthropology